Sport Relief 2010, was a fund raising event organised by Sport Relief, broadcast live on BBC One and BBC Two from the evening of 19 March 2010 to early the following morning. It was held on Friday 19 March and Saturday 20 March 2010 from 7:00pm to 1:30am at the BBC Television Centre.

Presenters

Donation Progress

According to the official site £44,250,251 has been raised as of January 2011.

Appeals

Sketches

Musical Performances

Trivia
During the opening credits of the show the music provided was AC/DC's "Back in Black".

References

External links
BBC Red Nose Day Page
Red Nose Day Official Website
Red Nose Day Schedule

Comic Relief
2010 in British television
2010
2010 in British sport
March 2010 events in the United Kingdom